Ein Tzurim (lit. Rock Spring) is a religious kibbutz in southern Israel. Located south of Kiryat Malakhi, it falls under the jurisdiction of Shafir Regional Council and is a member of the Religious Kibbutz Movement.

History

Original kibbutz

The kibbutz was founded on 23 October 1946 as a new settlement in Gush Etzion (east of the present-day location). Its founders were Palestine-born members of the fifth gar'in of Bnei Akiva that had formed in Tirat Zvi.

By 1947 the kibbutz had a population of 80. However, during the 1948 Arab–Israeli war, it was destroyed by the Jordanian army along with all the other settlements in Gush Etzion. The men who stayed to fight were captured as prisoners of war and taken to the Mafrak Prisoner of War camp.

With the renewal of Jewish settlement in Gush Etzion after the Six-Day War, a new kibbutz called Rosh Tzurim was founded on the original location of Ein Tzurim.

Relocation

In 1949 the people who left Ein Tzurim founded a new kibbutz in south-central Israel near the existing villages of Zerahia, Shafir and Merkaz Shapira, and they named it "Ein Tzurim" as a symbol of continuity. It was founded on  land belonging to the depopulated Palestinian village of al-Sawafir al-Sharqiyya.

In the 1980s two major educational centers were built in the area of the kibbutz; Yeshivat Kibbutz HaDati and the Yaakov Herzog Center for the Study of Judaism. However, in 2008 the yeshiva closed due to insufficient enrollment. Every Yom Kippur former students return to pray together.

After the Gaza disengagement in 2005, some evacuees from Gush Katif moved into a trailer park near the kibbutz and plans were drawn up for permanent housing.

Economy
The economy is based on fruit orchards (lemon and persimmon), vegetable crops (artichokes), dairy farming and turkey-breeding. The kibbutz also has an air-conditioner factory and runs a guesthouse.

Historic images

References

Further reading
Yossi Katz, Between Jerusalem and Hebron: Jewish Settlement in the Pre-State Period

External links
Information about the original Kibbutz Ein Tzurim  Etzion Bloc 
Yaakov Herzog Center for Jewish Studies

Kibbutzim
Religious Kibbutz Movement
Populated places established in 1946
Populated places established in 1949
Jewish villages depopulated during the 1948 Arab–Israeli War
Jewish villages in Mandatory Palestine
Populated places in Southern District (Israel)
1946 establishments in Mandatory Palestine
1949 establishments in Israel